New World Disorder is the fifth studio album by American band Biohazard. It was  released on June 8, 1999 by Mercury Records. It is the only record Biohazard released on Mercury, and their last major label album to date, as well as the only Biohazard studio release to feature former Helmet guitarist Rob Echiverria. It was produced by Ed Stasium, who previously produced State of the World Address.

It features guest appearances from Sticky Fingaz, Christian Olde Wolbers, and Igor Cavalera.

Commercial performance 
Commercially, New World Disorder has been considered a commercial disaster for the band. The album charted at number 187 on the Billboard 200 chart. By January 2000, the album had sold 40,000 copies in the US, and by May 2002 had sold 51,408 copies in the US according to Nielsen Soundscan. In January 2000, Evan Seinfeld claimed that the album had sold 250,000 copies worldwide.

Following the poor sales of the album, Biohazard left Mercury Records in late 1999. Since then, band has been hostile to questions about their record deal with Mercury; Evan Seinfeld said that Mercury had "slipped" with the album's promotion as the reason the band left the label. When asked about the record deal in 2018, Rob Echiverria said "no comment".

Track listing

Personnel
Evan Seinfeld – bass, lead vocals
Billy Graziadei – guitars, lead vocals
Rob Echeverria – lead guitar
Danny Schuler – drums

Charts

References

Biohazard (band) albums
1999 albums
Albums produced by Ed Stasium
Mercury Records albums